Rho Serpentis, Latinized from ρ Serpentis, is a single star in the Caput section of the equatorial Serpens constellation. It has an orange hue and is faintly visible to the naked eye with an apparent visual magnitude of +4.78. The distance to this star is approximately 375 light years based on parallax, but it is drifting closer to the Sun with a radial velocity of −62 km/s.

This is an aging giant star  with a stellar classification of K4.5III. It is a suspected variable star of unknown type, with an I-band brightness ranging from 3.29 down to 3.44 magnitude. Hipparcos photometry revealed a microvariability with a frequency of 0.17017 cycles per day and an amplitude of 0.0080. With the supply of hydrogen exhausted at its core, it has expanded and now has 48 times the Sun's girth. The star is radiating 492 times the luminosity of the Sun from its swollen photosphere at an effective temperature of 3,930 K.

References

K-type giants
Suspected variables

Serpens (constellation)
Serpentis, Rho
Durchmusterung objects
Serpentis, 38
141992
077661
5899